The Riverside Diversion Dam (or simply the Riverside Dam) was a diversion dam on the Rio Grande to the southeast of El Paso, Texas.  The dam was owned by the United States Bureau of Reclamation, and diverted water into the Riverside Canal for use in irrigation in the El Paso Valley.
The dam became obsolete with completion of a cement-lined canal carrying water from the upstream American Diversion Dam to the head of the canal. 
It was partially removed in 2003.

Construction

The 21 May 1906 treaty between the United States and Mexico for "an equitable distribution of the waters of the Rio Grande" guaranteed Mexico up to  annually, with the Americans taking the rest, except in time of drought when the shares would be reduced on a percentage basis.

Riverside Diversion Dam was the lowermost dam of the Rio Grande Project, downstream from the Mexican dam. 
The crest elevation was 
The spillway had six radial gates, each , with an overflow weir for excess water.

On average the El Paso County diverted  into the Riverside Diversion Dam / Riverside Canal each year between 1928 and 1998.

American dam and canal

To ensure that they got their agreed share of Rio Grande water, in 1935 Congress authorized construction of the American Dam, 
Between 1997 and 1998 a cement-lined extension to the American Canal replaced part of the earthen Franklin Canal. The Rio Grande American Canal Extension fed water into the Riverside Canal near to the dam.

Failure and removal

The Riverside Diversion Dam failed on 9 June 1987 due to flooding in the Rio Grande.
With completion of the Rio Grande American Canal Extension, there was little need to rebuild the dam.
In September 2003 the Socorro Field Division of the Bureau of Reclamation removed part of the failed diversion dam and coffer dam to improve flood control capability in the Rio Grande.
The project required coordination between the Bureau of Reclamation, International Boundary and Water Commission and El Paso County Water and Improvement District No. 1.

References
Citations

Sources

 

Dams in Texas
Dams completed in 1935
Dams on the Rio Grande